HMS Thetis was a  wooden screw corvette built for the Royal Navy in the late 1860s.

History

Thetis was driven ashore in 1874 whilst on duty in the East Indies. It was reported that she would be repaired at Bombay, India or Trincomalee, Ceylon. On 10 March 1879, she was damaged by fire at Keyham, Devon. The fire was caused by improper storage of materials on board which spontaneously combusted. Damage amounted to £4,000 worth of stores lost and £1,000 worth to the ship. She was present at the Bay of Pisagua when Chilean troops captured the port on 2 November 1879, during the Tarapaca Campaign.

References

Bibliography

External links
 Thetis at William Loney website
 Thetis at the Naval Database website

 

Ships built in Plymouth, Devon
Corvettes of the Royal Navy
1871 ships
Victorian-era corvettes of the United Kingdom
Maritime incidents in 1874
Maritime incidents in March 1879